Richard Brooke Jackson (born March 5, 1947) known professionally as R. Brooke Jackson, is a Senior United States District Judge serving on the United States District Court for the District of Colorado. Jackson formerly had served as a Colorado state judge.

Early life and education
Born in Bozeman, Montana, Jackson earned an Artium Baccalaureus from Dartmouth College in 1969. He then earned a Juris Doctor in 1972 from Harvard Law School.

Legal career 
Jackson spent 26 years with the law firm Holland & Hart, including as an associate from 1972 until 1978, and as a partner from 1978 until 1998. Jackson was appointed to the state bench in 1998, and in 2003 was named Chief Judge for Colorado's First Judicial District, which covers Jefferson County, Colorado and Gilpin County, Colorado.

Federal judicial service 
On September 29, 2010, President Barack Obama nominated Jackson to a judicial seat on the United States District Court for the District of Colorado, to fill the vacancy created by the death of Judge Phillip S. Figa. Jackson's nomination lapsed at the end of 2010. President Obama renominated him on January 5, 2011. The United States Senate confirmed him by unanimous consent on August 2, 2011. He received his judicial commission on September 1, 2011. He assumed senior status on September 30, 2021.

Notable rulings 
On June 5, 2020, Jackson issued a temporary restraining order against the City and County of Denver, Colorado, and the Denver Police Department in particular, forbidding assaults against peaceful protesters who participate in demonstrations against George Floyd's murder by the Minneapolis Police Department. The order included other police officers working with the City and County of Denver. Specifically, the order forbid using tear gas, pepper spray, pepper balls and rubber bullets against protesters unless a Captain is on scene, witnesses an act of violence, and gives an order to use them; and forbids the use of projectiles shot at protestors aimed at the head, back or pelvis. The rioters suffered injures such as broken bones (including facial bones), ruptured scrotums (due to aiming at the groin), and included attacks on "medics" trying to render aid to injured rioters.

References

External links

R. Brooke Jackson District of Colorado

1947 births
Living people
21st-century American judges
Colorado state court judges
Dartmouth College alumni
Harvard Law School alumni
Judges of the United States District Court for the District of Colorado
People from Bozeman, Montana
United States district court judges appointed by Barack Obama